Arbor Lodge may refer to:
 Arbor Lodge State Historical Park and Arboretum in Nebraska City, Nebraska
 Arbor Lodge, Portland, Oregon, a neighborhood of Portland, Oregon